Leszek Henryk Balcerowicz (pronounced ; born 19 January 1947) is a Polish economist, statesman, and Professor at Warsaw School of Economics. He served as Chairman of the National Bank of Poland (2001–2007) and twice as Deputy Prime Minister of Poland (1989–1991, 1997–2001). In 1989, he became Minister of Finance in Tadeusz Mazowiecki's first non-communist government and led the free-market economic reforms, proponents of which say they have transformed Poland into one of Europe's fastest growing economies, but which critics say were followed by a large increase in unemployment. In 2007, he founded the Civil Development Forum (Forum Obywatelskiego Rozwoju) think-tank and became the chairman of its council.

Biography 
In 1970 he graduated with distinction from the Foreign Trade faculty of the Central School of Planning and Statistics in Warsaw (currently: SGH Warsaw School of Economics). Balcerowicz received his MBA from St. John's University in New York, in 1974 and doctorate from the Central School of Planning and Statistics in 1975.

He was a member of the Polish communist party (Polish United Workers' Party) from 1969 until the declaration of martial law in Poland, in 1981. In the late 1970s he participated in an economic-advisory team associated with the prime minister of People's Republic of Poland. In 1978–1980 he worked at the Institute of Marxism-Leninism. Later he became an economics expert in the pro-democracy independent trade union Solidarity (NSZZ "Solidarność").

From 1989 to 1991 and also between 1997 and 2000 he was the Deputy Prime Minister and Finance Minister of Poland. Between 1995 and 2000 he was the chairman of Freedom Union, a centrist free-market political party. On 22 December 2000 he became the Chairman of the National Bank of Poland. He was also a columnist for Wprost, a Polish news magazine.

On 11 November 2005, the President of Poland, Aleksander Kwaśniewski, awarded L. Balcerowicz with the Order of the White Eagle for his "contribution to Poland's economic transformation". In 2006 he was elected member of Galeria Chwały Polskiej Ekonomii, a hall of fame for "outstanding Polish economists".

Balcerowicz is a member of the Commission on Legal Empowerment of the Poor, an independent initiative hosted by the UNDP and the first global initiative to focus specifically on the link between exclusion, poverty and the law. He is also a member of the influential Washington-based financial advisory body, the Group of Thirty, and is a board member of renowned Washington, D.C. think-tank the Peterson Institute. Fellow of Collegium Invisibile.

Since 11 June 2008 Balcerowicz has been a member of the board of Bruegel, the Brussels-based think tank on international economics.

Since 2007, he has led the Civil Development Forum (Forum Obywatelskiego Rozwoju), a think-tank with a mission of "increasing active support of the society for a wide range of individual freedoms (especially economic  freedom), and – what goes with it – for strengthening the rule of law in the country". 

In 2016 he was appointed as representative of the Ukrainian President in the Cabinet of ministers.

Balcerowicz Plan 

The Balcerowicz Plan was a series of reforms, which brought the end to hyperinflation, dismantled inefficient economic structures, and balanced the national budget. The prices of most consumer goods were freed and caps for annual increases established in state-sector employees' wages. Poland's currency, the zloty, was made convertible within the country's borders. This resulted in a substantial increase in prices and had forced state-owned companies while making them economically competitive. This amounted to a two-year shock to the Polish economy. Among other actions included in the plan was the negotiation of a significant reduction (approximately 50%) of the debts inherited from the Polish People's Republic.

The severity of the reforms was initially controversial and made Balcerowicz an object of criticism by some politicians in Poland. On the other hand, many economists and experts such as Krzysztof Sobczak, Jeffrey Sachs, and Jacek Rostowski agree that without introducing such radical changes, Poland's economic success and steady economic growth would not have been possible. Since 1991, Poland's annual growth rate was one of the highest of all post-Communist economies, while the country has experienced uninterrupted growth for over 28 years – the longest in the world, along Australia. In 1998, he was awarded the Euromoney Finance Minister of the Year Award for his accomplishments as a finance minister.

Criticism
High unemployment remained a problem for some two decades after the implementation of the reforms, leaving certain poverty-stricken regions with structural unemployment. Reducing unprofitability of the state-owned companies required significant layoffs. Even though over 2 million Poles emigrated from Poland since its entry into the EU, until 2010s, the unemployment level remained at 13%. Populist politician Andrzej Lepper, the leader of the populist Self-Defense (Samoobrona) party, created the slogan: "Balcerowicz must go" (Balcerowicz musi odejść), echoing the disgruntlement felt by some Poles with Balcerowicz's plan. However, since 2013, the unemployment rate has not exceeded 10% and in 2019 has reached the record low of 3.8%.

The BELLS
During the Eurozone crisis Balcerowicz has been an outspoken supporter for fiscal discipline and has been frequently dubbed the anti-Bernanke for his scorn of distortionary fiscal stimulus. In various articles he has developed a comparison between the fiscally-profligate PIGS (Portugal, Italy, Greece and Spain) and the fiscally-disciplined BELLs (Bulgaria, Estonia, Latvia and Lithuania). Responsible fiscal policy brings about better growth outcomes, claims Leszek Balcerowicz. He has many followers among East European economists, most prominently Simeon Djankov, Deputy prime Minister and Minister of Finance of Bulgaria between 2009 and 2013.

Private life
Balcerowicz was a competitive athlete in his youth. In 1966, he became Poland's youth champion in cross country at the distance of 1500 meters. Since 1977, he has been married to Ewa Balcerowicz, an economist. He has three children.

Honorary doctorates 

 1993 University of Aix-en-Provence, France
 1994 University of Sussex, United Kingdom
 1996 DePaul University, United States
 1998:
 University of Szczecin, Poland
 Nicolaus Copernicus University in Toruń, Poland
 Staffordshire University, United Kingdom
 Abertay University, United Kingdom
 1999 University of Economics in Bratislava, Slovakia
 2001 Viadrina European University,  Germany
 2002:
 University of the Pacific, Peru
 University of Iaşi, Romania
 2004 University of Duisburg, Germany
 2006:
 University of Economics in Katowice, Poland
 Poznań University of Economics, Poland
 Wrocław University of Economics, Poland
 University of Gdańsk, Poland
 2007 Warsaw School of Economics,  Poland
 2008:
 University of Warsaw, Poland
 University of New South Wales, Australia
 2009 Babeş-Bolyai University  Romania
 2011 Central Connecticut State University United States
 2015 Universidad Francisco Marroquín Guatemala

Selected publications
Socialism, Capitalism, Transformation, Central European University Press, Budapest, 1995
Wolność i rozwój: ekonomia wolnego rynku, Znak, Kraków, 1995
Post-Communist Transition: Some Lessons, Institute of Economic Affairs, London, 2002
Towards a Limited State, World Bank, 2003
Institutional Systems and Economic Growth, in: Challenges of Globalization. Imbalances and Growth, edited by Anders Åslund and Marek Dąbrowski, Peterson Institutute for International Economics, p. 153–199, Washington, DC, 2008
Zagadki wzrostu gospodarczego (Puzzles of Economic Growth), Leszek Balcerowicz, Andrzej Rzońca, C.H. Beck Sp. z o.o., Warsaw, 2010
Odkrywając wolność. Przeciw zniewoleniu umysłów, Leszek Balcerowicz, ZYSK i S-KA Wydawnictwo, 2012
Wzrost gospodarczy w Unii Europejskiej (Economic Growth in the European Union),  Lisbon Council e-book, Leszek Balcerowicz (main author), A. Rzońca, L. Kalina, A. Łaszek, 2013
Trzeba się bić. Opowieść biograficzna, Leszek Balcerowicz, Marta Stremecka, Wydawnictwo Czerwone i Czarne, Warsaw, 2014
Euro Imbalances and Adjustment: A Comperative Analysis, The Cato Journal, nr 3, 2014

See also 
 Yegor Gaidar – architect of the post-Soviet economic reforms in Russia.
 Economy of Poland
 List of Poles

References

External links 

 Leszek Balcerowicz at CSA Celebrity Speakers
 Leszek Balcerowicz's Official Website 
 Interview with L. Balcerowicz by PBS 11/12/2000 
 Business Week Stars of Europe: Agenda Setters 
 Leszek Balcerowicz's op/ed commentaries for Project Syndicate
 

1947 births
Living people
People from Lipno, Lipno County
Deputy Prime Ministers of Poland
Finance Ministers of Poland
Governors of the National Bank of Poland
Group of Thirty
20th-century Polish economists
Polish United Workers' Party members
Recipients of the Order of the Cross of Terra Mariana, 2nd Class
Polish expatriates in Ukraine
SGH Warsaw School of Economics alumni
Academic staff of the SGH Warsaw School of Economics
Bruegel (think tank) people
21st-century Polish economists
Member of the Mont Pelerin Society